Shann Schillinger (born May 22, 1986) is a former American football safety. He was drafted by the Atlanta Falcons in the sixth round of the 2010 NFL Draft. He played college football at Montana. He was also a member of the Tennessee Titans.

Early years
Schillinger attended Baker High School, where he was a four-year letterman in football, and his varsity teams had an overall record of 49–1. He was a two-time all-state selection. As a senior, he passed for 1,059 yards and 15 touchdowns and rushed for 650 yards and 14 touchdowns. He was a team captain for the East (along with Grizzly teammate Shawn Lebsock) in Montana's annual East-West Shrine Game. He also played in the Badlands Bowl (Montana-North Dakota All-Star Game). He also lettered four times in both basketball and track.

College career
Schillinger played college football at Montana. During his freshman year, Schillinger was forced to redshirt because of a leg injury, but played in all 14 games in 2006 and 2007 as a backup. He started all 16 games in 2008, tying for the team lead with four interceptions and two forced fumbles to be named second-team All-Big Sky. He earned the Tony Barbour Award as the player which best exemplifies Grizzly football. He had 90 tackles and started every game as a senior, when he was named All-Big Sky, first-team. Schillinger wasn't invited to the NFL Scouting Combine but did participate in the Texas vs. Nation showcase.

Professional career

Atlanta Falcons
Schillinger was selected by the Atlanta Falcons in the sixth round (171st overall) of the 2010 NFL Draft. On June 6, 2010, the Atlanta Falcons signed Schillinger to a four-year contract.

Tennessee Titans
Schillinger was signed by the Tennessee Titans on November 27, 2013. After playing in one game for the team, Schillinger was released by the Titans on December 3, 2013.

Coaching career
After retiring from the NFL, Schillinger became a wide receivers and special team coach at Dickinson State in 2014. A year later, he went to Nebraska as an assistant coach. He returned to Montana in 2016 to become the defensive back/safeties coach at the University of Montana. In 2022, he became a defensive analyst for Mississippi State.
He’s currently an assistant coach at Bismarck High School in Bismarck, ND.

References

External links
Atlanta Falcons bio
Montana Grizzlies football bio
ESPN profile

1986 births
Living people
Players of American football from Montana
American football safeties
Montana Grizzlies football players
Atlanta Falcons players
People from Baker, Montana
Tennessee Titans players
Dickinson State Blue Hawks football coaches
Nebraska Cornhuskers football coaches
Montana Grizzlies football coaches